Cult Classic is the twelfth studio album by American hard rock band Blue Öyster Cult, released in 1994 and containing newly recorded versions of many of the band's previous hits. It was reissued by other labels under the titles Champions of Rock and E.T.I. Revisited in 1998 and 2004, with different artwork. A remastered version was released on January 24, 2020, by Frontiers Records.

Track listing

Personnel

Band members
Eric Bloom - lead vocals, stun guitar, keyboards, producer
Donald 'Buck Dharma' Roeser - lead guitar, vocals, keyboards, producer
Allen Lanier - keyboards, rhythm guitar, backing vocals
Jon Rogers - bass, backing vocals
Chuck Burgi - drums, percussion, backing vocals

Production
Jeff Kawalek - associate producer, engineer
Danny Madorski - engineer
Mick Gormaley - digital editing
Steve Schenck - executive producer

References

External links
 Reference at official band page
 Review with comments

Blue Öyster Cult albums
1994 remix albums
Caroline Records remix albums
SPV/Steamhammer albums